An envoy extraordinary and minister plenipotentiary, usually known as a minister, was a diplomatic head of mission who was ranked below ambassador. A diplomatic mission headed by an envoy was known as a legation rather than an embassy. Under the system of diplomatic ranks established by the Congress of Vienna (1815), an envoy was a diplomat of the second class who had plenipotentiary powers, i.e., full authority to represent the government. However, envoys did not serve as the personal representative of their country's head of state. Until the first decades of the 20th century, most diplomatic missions were legations headed by diplomats of the envoy rank. Ambassadors were only exchanged between great powers, close allies, and related monarchies.

After World War II it was no longer considered acceptable to treat some nations as inferior to others, given the United Nations doctrine of equality of sovereign states. The rank of envoy gradually became obsolete as countries upgraded their relations to the ambassadorial rank. The envoy rank still existed in 1961, when the Vienna Convention on Diplomatic Relations was signed, but it did not outlive the decade. The last remaining American legations, in the Warsaw Pact countries of Bulgaria and Hungary, were upgraded to embassies in 1966.

Other usages of the title

Popular parlance
In popular parlance, an envoy can mean a diplomat of any rank. Moreover, the rank of envoy should not be confused with the position of Special Envoy, which is a relatively modern invention, appointed for a specific purpose rather than for bilateral diplomacy, and may be held by a person of any diplomatic rank or none (though usually held by an ambassador).

Kingdom of the Netherlands
The minister plenipotentiary represents the Caribbean countries Aruba, Curaçao and Sint Maarten in the Netherlands, where they form part of the Council of Ministers of the Kingdom.

References

Diplomatic ranks